Yelia is a stratovolcano and collection of lava domes in Eastern Highlands Province, Papua New Guinea. It was first identified in 1963. The summit crater is occupied by a large lava dome which bears 11 craters. Two large lava domes are located on its north-northeastern slopes while two smaller domes are located to the west. No eruptions in the Holocene are known and the last major eruption occurred 18,000 years ago. However, there are unconfirmed reports from the native population of an eruption in the 1940s. The volcano presently displays fumarolic activity at its summit.

See also
 List of volcanoes in Papua New Guinea

References

Dormant volcanoes
Mountains of Papua New Guinea
Stratovolcanoes of Papua New Guinea
Eastern Highlands Province
Pleistocene stratovolcanoes